The Woman from the Orient is a 1923 German silent film directed by Wolfgang Neff and starring Oskar Marion, Fritz Greiner and Hedda Vernon.

The film's sets were designed by the art director Franz Schroedter.

Cast
 Oskar Marion as Marcel Regard
 Fritz Greiner as Emir Said
 Hedda Vernon as Miss Pawlett
 Ernst Rückert as Percy Manot
 Dary Holm as Lu
 Esther Carena as Claire Barraine
 Josef Karma as Astronomieprofessor

References

Bibliography
 Alfred Krautz. International directory of cinematographers, set- and costume designers in film, Volume 4. Saur, 1984.

External links

1923 films
Films of the Weimar Republic
German silent feature films
Films directed by Wolfgang Neff
German black-and-white films
1920s German films